7H or 7-H can refer to:

A-7H, a model of LTV A-7 Corsair II
7H-Benz(de)anthracene-7-one, or Benzanthrone
Hydrogen-7 (7H), an isotope of hydrogen
7H, a model of SET 7 floatplanes
MD 7H, see Maryland Route 7
IATA code for Era Alaska
7H, the production code for the 1988 Doctor Who serial Remembrance of the Daleks

See also
H7 (disambiguation)
Minolta Dimage 7Hi; a digital bridge camera by Minolta